The Communication Workers Union of Australia is a trade union in Australia. It is a division of the Communications, Electrical and Plumbing Union of Australia.

It was formed in 1992 as a standalone Union following the merger of the Australian Postal and Telecommunications Union and the Australian Telecommunications Employees Association/Australian Telephone and Phonogram Officers Association. At the time of the merger the union had a membership of approximately 85,000. In 1993 it absorbed the Telecommunications Officers Association (TOA). The CWU amalgamated with the ETU and PPTEU to form the CEPU in 1994, thereafter becoming a division of the larger union. The three CEPU Divisions largely operate autonomously, as separate entities, on a day to day basis.

References

External links

 National Divisional Office
 Central Branch (NSW/ACT/QLD/SA/NT
 Western Australia Branch
 Tasmania Branch
 Victoria Branch

Trade unions in Australia
UNI Global Union
Communications trade unions
Trade unions established in 1912
1912 establishments in Australia